The 1935 Cork Senior Football Championship was the 47th staging of the Cork Senior Football Championship since its establishment by the Cork County Board in 1887. 

Beara entered the championship as the defending champions.

On 6 October 1935, Macroom won the championship following a 1-03 to 1-02 defeat of Clonakilty in the final. This was their 8th championship title overall and their first title since 1931.

Results

Final

References

Cork Senior Football Championship